Bharti Kher is a contemporary artist. In a career spanning nearly three decades, she has worked across painting, sculpture and installation. Throughout her practice she has displayed an unwavering relationship with the body, its narratives, and the nature of things. Inspired by a wide range of sources and making practices, she employs the readymade in wide arc of meaning and transformation. Kher's works thus appear to move through time, using reference as a counterpoint and contradiction as a visual tool.

Early life 

Kher was born in London, England, in 1969. She studied at Middlesex Polytechnic, London, from 1987 to 1988, and then attended the Foundation Course in Art and Design at Newcastle Polytechnic from 1998 to 1991, receiving a BA Honours in Fine Art, Painting.  She moved to India in 1993, where she lives and works today.

Selected works and themes 

Central themes within her work include the notion of the self as formed by multiple and interlocking relationships with human and animal bodies, places and readymade objects. She taps into diverse yet unlocatable mythologies and the numerous associations that a place or material can evoke.

Bindi

Kher is known internationally for her signature use of the bindi in works across painting and sculpture. Derived from the Sanskrit word bindu – meaning point, drop, dot or small particle – and rooted in ritual and philosophical traditions, the bindi is a dot applied to the centre of the forehead as a representation of a spiritual third eye. Originally applied with natural pigment, bindis have transformed over time to become a popular, mass-produced accessory. Kher reclaims this way of seeing by creating intensely layered and lavish 'paintings' that are charged with the bindi's conceptual and visual links to ideas such as repetition, the sacred and the ritual, appropriation, and a deliberate sign of the feminine. The bindi becomes a language or code we begin to read through works that elicit formal connections with traditions across Western and Indian art.

The Skin Speaks a language not its own (2006) is one of her most famous and talked about work. It is a sculpture that represents a life size female elephant made from fiberglass and adorned by numerous bindis. This sculpture combine two of the most common symbols of Indian tradition (bindi) and the Hindu religion (the elephant). This sculpture can be seen as the archetype of India.

Intermediaries

An important theme in Kher's practice is the idea of transformation, where she activates materials to give them a new form. Her "Intermediaries" series is exemplary of this, where the artist collects brightly painted clay figurines traditionally displayed in South India during the autumn festive season, which she shatters and then puts back together in order to create fantastical creatures: animal hybrids, irregular and strange people. She deconstructs narratives to create legends of her own.

Balance
Inspired from sacred geometry and ancient mathematics, Kher's practice is preoccupied with the finding the equilibrium of several forces. She is interested in the question of balance and in achieving a 'steady state' by putting together a surreal conjunction of elements. Drawn from found objects these works are strange and tantalizing disparate forms – all held together in a delicate but precarious moment of unison.

Women and the body

Over the course of her long career, Kher has engaged consistently with the body – her own and those of women around her – and has done so across several mediums and forms of art making. These have evolved from her 'Warrior series' (Cloudwalker, The messenger, Warrior with cloak and shield, And all the while the benevolent slept) to her 'Sari portraits' where she drapes her sculptures in resin-coated saris. In these works, Kher consciously mixes up mutually contradictory characteristics of different genders and their possibilities of metaphor. She sees the body as a literal and metaphorical site for the construction of ideas around gender, mythology and narrative. The most significant example of this is her process of casting, which she regards as a most intimate exercise in rendering the human emotions of her subjects and not just their physical form. Six Women (2013–2015), is a series of life-sized, sitting female sculptures, cast from real women in her New Delhi studio. Critically, the vulnerability of the women stems only in part from their nakedness; Kher's sitters are sex workers, paid by the artist to sit for her, in a self-conscious transaction of money and bodily experience.

Bharti Kher has worked in a variety of media creating paintings, sculptures, installations, and text. Kher's primary material is manufactured versions of traditional Indian bindi. Throughout her career Kher has kept some repeating patterns in her paintings from her student years from the late 1980s to the early 1990s. Kher considers how the realities of human life is perceived in our current time. Her works displays fondness towards human drama, as well as intrinsic love. Her sculptures and collages often depict hybrid forms that unite different social constructs such as race, and gender etc.

Exhibitions 

Recent solo exhibitions
The Body is a Place, Arnolfini, Bristol (2022-23)
A Consummate Joy, Irish Museum of Modern Art (2020)
The Unexpected Freedom of Chaos, Galerie Perrotin New York (2020)
A Wonderful Anarchy, Hauser & Wirth Somerset (2019)
Djinns, Things, Places, Galerie Perrotin Tokyo (2018)
Chimeras, Centre Pasqu'Art Biel (2018)
Dark Matter, Museum Frieder Burda Berlin (2017)
This Breathing House, Freud Museum London (2016)
The Laws of Reversed Effort, Galerie Perrotin, Paris (2016)
Matter, Vancouver Art Gallery, Vancouver (2016)
In Her Own Language, Lawrence Wilson Art Gallery Perth (2016)
Three decimal points. Of a minute of a second. Of a degree, Hauser & Wirth, Zürich (2014)
Misdemeanours, Rockbund Art Museum, Shanghai (2014)

Recent group exhibitions
In the Company of Artists, Isabella Stewart Gardner Museum (2019)
Desire: A revision from the 20th Century to the Digital Age, Irish Museum of Modern Art (2019)
Surface Work, Victoria Miro, London (2018)
Facing India, Kunstmuseum Wolfsburg, Wolfsburg (2018)
Like Life: Sculpture, Colour and the Body (1300-Now), The Metropolitan Museum, New York (2018)

Collections 
Kher's work is in the Tate Modern in London, the Vancouver Art Gallery, and the Walker Art Center.

References

External links
Bharti Kher at Archives of Women Artists, Research and Exhibitions
Bharti Kher at Artnet.com
Bharti Kher at 

Living people
1969 births
20th-century English women artists
21st-century English women artists
Alumni of Middlesex University
Alumni of Northumbria University
Artists from London
British contemporary artists
British contemporary painters
British multimedia artists